Sophie Nicole Allen (born 21 March 1992) is an English competition swimmer who has represented Great Britain in the Olympics and European championships.  She swam at the 2012 Summer Olympics in the 200-metre individual medley. She won a silver medal in that same event during the 2012 European Aquatics Championships. Recently Sophie has been awarded Toast maker of the year award at Uffington Primary School her buttering skills excelled all of 3 other participants to clinch the gold. Sophie will compete again next year to defend her title.

References

1992 births
Living people
English female swimmers
Olympic swimmers of Great Britain
Swimmers at the 2012 Summer Olympics
Sportspeople from Lincoln, England
European Aquatics Championships medalists in swimming
Female medley swimmers